Epe or EPE may refer to:

Places 
 Epe, North Rhine-Westphalia, Germany
 Epe, Netherlands
 Epe, Lagos, Nigeria
 Eastern Peripheral Expressway, National Capital Region, India

Science 
 Electric potential energy
 Elvis Presley Enterprises, an American entertainment company
 England's Past for Everyone, an English historical research project
 Ephenidine
 European Parliament of Enterprises, a business organization
 Everyday Practical Electronics, a British hobbyist magazine
 Expanded polyethylene

See also 
 Épée, a weapon used in sport fencing
 Treaty of Epe